David Manker Abshire (April 11, 1926 – October 31, 2014) served as a Special Counselor to President Ronald Reagan and was the United States Permanent Representative to NATO from 1983 to 1987. Abshire presided over the Center for the Study of the Presidency and Congress.

In July 2002, he was elected President of the Richard Lounsbery Foundation of New York. He was a member of the exclusive Alfalfa Club.

Abshire was a Republican and the author of seven books, the most recent being A Call to Greatness: Challenging Our Next President, which was published in 2008. Abshire was married and had five children.

He was a member of the advisory council of the Victims of Communism Memorial Foundation and sat  on the advisory board of America Abroad Media.

Background

Early life 
Abshire was born in Chattanooga, Tennessee on April 11, 1926.

Education and early career 
He graduated from The Bright School in 1938, and Baylor School in Chattanooga in 1944.

Abshire graduated from the US Military Academy at West Point in 1951. Then he received his doctorate in History from Georgetown University in 1959, where for many years he was an adjunct professor at its Edmund A. Walsh School of Foreign Service. He is a member of the Project on National Security Reform. Till 1977 he worked as administrator in the Advisory Board at St. Albans School and in the Board of Advisors at Naval War College.

Military 
Abshire fought in the Korean War 1951–1955, where he served as platoon leader, division intelligence officer and company commander. He received various distinctions: the Bronze Star with Oak Leaf Cluster with V for Valor, Combat Infantry Badge and Commendation Ribbon with medal pendant.

Political life
In 1962, Abshire and Admiral Arleigh Burke founded the Center for Strategic and International Studies (CSIS). In 1988, as President of CSIS, he merged the Hawaii-based Pacific Forum into his organization to give it more input from the Asia-Pacific region.  Dr. Abshire served as Assistant Secretary of State for Congressional Relations from 1970 to 1973 and later as Chairman of the U.S. Board of International Broadcasting (1975–77). He was a member of the Murphy Commission (1974–75), the President's Foreign Intelligence Advisory Board (1981–1982), and the President's Task Force on U.S. Government International Broadcasting (1991).

During the transition of government in 1980, Abshire was asked by President-elect Reagan to head the National Security Group, which included the State and Defense Departments, the U.S. Information Agency, and the Central Intelligence Agency. He served for nine years on the board of Procter & Gamble.

Personal 
Abshire was married to Carolyn Lamar Sample. He had four daughters and one son: Anna Lamar Bowman, Mary Lee Jensvold, Phyllis d'Hoop, Caroline Hall and Lupton Abshire.

Ambassador to NATO
In 1983–1987 Abshire was Ambassador to NATO where, in reaction to the threat posed by Soviet SS-20 missiles, he was appointed to oversee the deployment of Pershing and Cruise missiles. For his service, he was given the Distinguished Public Service Medal.

Special Counselor to President Reagan
Abshire was recalled as the Iran-Contra Affair unfolded to serve as Special Counselor to President Reagan with Cabinet rank. His charge was to assure a full investigation of the sale of arms to Iran so as to restore the confidence of the nation in the Reagan presidency.

Honors
 Doctor of Humane Letters from Virginia Theological Seminary in 1992.
 Doctor of Civil Law, honoris causa, from the University of the South in 1994.
 John Carroll Award for outstanding service by a Georgetown University alumnus.
 Distinguished Graduate Award of the United States Military Academy.
 1994 U.S. Military Academy's Castle Award
 Gold Medal of the Sons of the American Revolution
 Baylor Distinguished Alumni Award
 Order of the Crown (Belgium)
 Commander of the Order of Leopold (Belgium)
 Medal of the President of the Italian Republic, Senate, Parliament, and Government.
 Grand Official of the Order of Merit of the Italian Republic.
 Order of Diplomatic Service Merit Heung-In Medal (Korea)
 Insignia of the Commander, First Class, Order of the Lion of Finland
 Order of the Liberator (Argentina) in 1999.
 Order of the Sacred Treasure Gold and Silver Star (Japan) in 2001.
 Department of Defense Medal for Distinguished Public Service.
 Presidential Citizens Medal – Awarded in 1989 by President Ronald Reagan.
Doctor of Civil Law, honoris causa, from the University Georgetown in 2006.

Death
Abshire died on October 31, 2014 of pulmonary fibrosis in Alexandria, Virginia. He is survived by his wife of 56 years, the former Carolyn Sample, his son, Lupton, his daughters Anna Bowman, Mary Lee Jensvold, Phyliis d'Hoop and Carolyn Hall. He has 11 grandchildren.

Books
 National Security: Political, Military, and Economic Strategies in the Decade Ahead, 1963. .
 The South Rejects a Prophet: The Life of Senator D. M. Key, 1824–1900, Praeger, 1967.  .
 International Broadcasting: A New Dimension of Western Diplomacy, 1976.  . .
 Foreign Policy Makers: President vs. Congress, 1979.  . .
 Preventing World War III: A Realistic Grand Strategy, 1988. .
 Putting America's House in Order: The Nation as a Family (with Brock Brower), 1996. . .
 Saving the Reagan Presidency: Trust Is the Coin of the Realm (with Richard E. Neustadt), 2005.  . .
 A Call to Greatness: Challenging Our Next President, 2008.  . .

References

External links
 

1926 births
2014 deaths
United States Military Academy alumni
Permanent Representatives of the United States to NATO
United States Army officers
United States Army personnel of the Korean War
Reagan administration personnel
Recipients of the Order of the Crown (Belgium)
Recipients of the Medal of the Presidency of the Italian Republic
Grand Officers of the Order of Merit of the Italian Republic
Commanders First Class of the Order of the Lion of Finland
Recipients of the Order of the Liberator General San Martin
Recipients of the Order of the Sacred Treasure
Presidential Citizens Medal recipients
People from Chattanooga, Tennessee
Tennessee Republicans
Writers from Tennessee
Walsh School of Foreign Service alumni
Historians from Tennessee
CSIS people
Deaths from pulmonary fibrosis